Jämijärvi Airfield  is an airfield in Jämijärvi, Finland, about  south of Jämijärvi municipal centre. It is one of the busiest general aviation airfields in Finland.

A serious aviation accident happened near the airfield in April 2014.

History
Airfield is established in 1935.

See also
List of airports in Finland

References

External links

 VFR Suomi/Finland – Jämijärvi Airfield
 Lentopaikat.net – Jämijärvi Airfield 
 Jämi Myynti

Airports in Finland